Añes is a hamlet and council located in the municipality of Aiara, in Álava province, Basque Country, Spain. As of 2020, it has a population of 21.

Geography 
Añes is located 55km west-northwest of Vitoria-Gasteiz.

References

Populated places in Álava